Michelle Renuka Ananda-Rajah (Tamil: மிசேல் ஆனந்தராஜா; born 10 December 1972) is a Tamil Australian member of the Australian Labor Party for the Division of Higgins elected in the 2022 Australian federal election. Prior to entering politics, she was a clinician-scientist, and infections diseases physician.

Early life
Ananda-Rajah was born in London to Tamil parents who had fled from Sri Lanka in the early 1970s prior to the Sri Lankan Civil War. She lived in Zambia for 11 years until she moved to Australia as a child. Ananda-Rajah became an Australian citizen in 1996. She renounced her British citizenship in 2021. 

Ananda-Rajah achieved her bachelor’s degree in medicine and surgery (MBBS) in 1997 and her PhD in 2014 from the University of Sydney.

Career

Ananda-Rajah worked as a clinician-researcher and physician in infectious diseases and general medicine at Alfred Health. She is a graduate of USyd with honours and underwent speciality training in Victoria. In 2019, she was awarded a prestigious TRIP (Translating Research Into Practice) fellowship by the Medical Research Future Fund and appointed to JAMA Network Open as a statistical and methods reviewer. 

Michelle is the co-founder of Healthcare workers Australia, a grass roots advocacy group which has campaigned since August 2020 for improved respiratory protection.

Politics

Ananda-Rajah was preselected as the Labor candidate for Higgins in July 2021, ahead of the 2022 Australian federal election. She trailed Liberal incumbent Katie Allen for most of the night. However, on the seventh count, a Green candidate's preferences flowed overwhelmingly to Ananda-Rajah.

This gave Ananda-Rajah a 2.4% swing in primary vote and a 4.6% swing in two party preferred vote, to win the seat with a two party preferred vote of 52%, or a little under 4,000 votes. By winning, Ananda-Rajah became the first Labor member for Higgins in the seat's 73-year history.

References

1972 births
Living people
Medical doctors from Melbourne
Members of the Australian House of Representatives
Members of the Australian House of Representatives for Higgins
Australian Labor Party members of the Parliament of Australia
University of Sydney alumni
University of Melbourne alumni
Australian people of Tamil descent
British expatriates in Zambia
Women members of the Australian House of Representatives